was a private junior college in Shinjuku, Tokyo, Japan.

History 
The junior college was established in 1988 within the facilities of Keio University's Faculty of Medicine. Only women were allowed to attend the college, which provided qualifications of candidacy for the Japanese nursing examination. It stopped admitting students at the end of fiscal 2000, and was abolished in 2003.

Academic departments
 Nursing

External links 
 Closing ceremony details

Japanese junior colleges
Private universities and colleges in Japan
Universities and colleges in Tokyo
1988 establishments in Japan